Jewell County (county code JW) is a county located in the U.S. state of Kansas. As of the 2020 census, the county population was 2,932. Its county seat and most populous city is Mankato.

History

Early history

For many millennia, the Great Plains of North America was inhabited by nomadic Native Americans.  From the 16th century to 18th century, the Kingdom of France claimed ownership of large parts of North America.  In 1762, after the French and Indian War, France secretly ceded New France to Spain, per the Treaty of Fontainebleau.

19th century
In 1802, Spain returned most of the land to France, but keeping title to about 7,500 square miles.  In 1803, most of the land for modern day Kansas was acquired by the United States from France as part of the 828,000 square mile Louisiana Purchase for 2.83 cents per acre.

In 1854, the Kansas Territory was organized, then in 1861 Kansas became the 34th U.S. state.  In 1887, Jewell County was established and named for Lieutenant Colonel Lewis R. Jewell of the 6th Regiment Kansas Volunteer Cavalry.

In 1887, Atchison, Topeka and Santa Fe Railway built a branch line from Neva (3 miles west of Strong City) to Superior, Nebraska.  This branch line connected Strong City, Neva, Rockland, Diamond Springs, Burdick, Lost Springs, Jacobs, Hope, Navarre, Enterprise, Abilene, Talmage, Manchester, Longford, Oak Hill, Miltonvale, Aurora, Huscher, Concordia, Kackley, Courtland, Webber, Superior.  At some point, the line from Neva to Lost Springs was pulled but the right of way has not been abandoned.  This branch line was originally called "Strong City and Superior line" but later the name was shortened to the "Strong City line".  In 1996, the Atchison, Topeka and Santa Fe Railway merged with Burlington Northern Railroad and renamed to the current BNSF Railway. Most locals still refer to this railroad as the "Santa Fe".

Geography

Adjacent counties
 Nuckolls County, Nebraska (northeast)
 Republic County (east)
 Cloud County (southeast)
 Mitchell County (south)
 Osborne County (southwest)
 Smith County (west)
 Webster County, Nebraska (northwest)

Demographics

As of the 2000 census, there were 3,791 people, 1,695 households, and 1,098 families residing in the county.  The population density was 4 people per square mile (2/km2).  There were 2,103 housing units at an average density of 2 per square mile (1/km2).  The racial makeup of the county was 98.79% White, 0.34% Native American, 0.05% Asian, 0.03% Black or African American, 0.03% Pacific Islander, 0.05% from other races, and 0.71% from two or more races. Hispanic or Latino of any race were 0.71% of the population.

There were 1,695 households, out of which 23.70% had children under the age of 18 living with them, 58.10% were married couples living together, 4.80% had a female householder with no husband present, and 35.20% were non-families. 32.40% of all households were made up of individuals, and 18.10% had someone living alone who was 65 years of age or older.  The average household size was 2.21 and the average family size was 2.80.

In the county, the population was spread out, with 21.90% under the age of 18, 4.40% from 18 to 24, 21.50% from 25 to 44, 26.20% from 45 to 64, and 25.90% who were 65 years of age or older.  The median age was 46 years. For every 100 females there were 97.90 males.  For every 100 females age 18 and over, there were 96.00 males.

The median income for a household in the county was $30,538, and the median income for a family was $36,953. Males had a median income of $24,821 versus $18,170 for females. The per capita income for the county was $16,644.  About 8.40% of families and 11.60% of the population were below the poverty line, including 12.80% of those under age 18 and 10.90% of those age 65 or over.

Government

Presidential elections

Like all of Kansas outside the eastern cities, Jewell County is overwhelmingly Republican. The only Democratic presidential candidates to win a majority in the county have been Woodrow Wilson in 1916 and William Jennings Bryan in 1896, and the last Democrat to win a plurality was Franklin D. Roosevelt in 1932. Since 1940 only Lyndon Johnson in 1964 and Jimmy Carter in 1976 have exceeded 31 percent of the county's vote, a devotion to the GOP comparable to famous Appalachia Unionist strongholds like Avery County, North Carolina or Grant County, West Virginia.

Laws
Although the Kansas Constitution was amended in 1986 to allow the sale of alcoholic liquor by the individual drink with the approval of voters. Jewell County restaurants serve only 3.2 beer and no hard alcohol.

Education

Unified school districts
 Rock Hills USD 107

Communities

Cities
 Burr Oak
 Esbon
 Formoso
 Jewell
 Mankato
 Randall
 Webber

Unincorporated communities
Dentonia
 Ionia
 Lovewell
 Montrose
 North Branch
 Otego

Townships
Jewell County is divided into twenty-five townships.  None of the cities within the county are considered governmentally independent, and all figures for the townships include those of the cities.  In the following table, the population center is the largest city (or cities) included in that township's population total, if it is of a significant size.

See also
 Dry counties

References

Further reading

 Atlas and Plat Book of Jewell County, Kansas; Kenyon Co; 27 pages; 1921.
 Standard Atlas of Jewell County, Kansas; Geo. A. Ogle & Co; 59 pages; 1908.
 Atlas of Jewell County, Kansas; Gillen & Davy ; 52 pages; 1884.

External links

County
 
 Jewell County - Directory of Public Officials
 Jewell County - Community Development Association
Historical
 Jewell County Kansas History and Heritage Project, Genealogy
Maps
 Jewell County Maps: Current, Historic, KDOT
 Kansas Highway Maps: Current, Historic, KDOT
 Kansas Railroad Maps: Current, 1996, 1915, KDOT and Kansas Historical Society

 
Kansas counties
1887 establishments in Kansas
Populated places established in 1887